Sofien Moussa (born 6 February 1988) is a Tunisian footballer who most recently played as a striker for Academica Clinceni.

Moussa has previously played for such teams as Étoile Sportive du Sahel, Petrolul Ploiești, Tromsø and Dundee.

Career

Tunisia

AS Marsa
Moussa started his career at age 22 at hometown club AS Marsa where he spent four years playing in Tunisian Ligue Professionnelle 2.

Étoile du Sahel
At the end of the 2014 season he move up a division to Tunisian Ligue Professionnelle 1 to join one of the top clubs in Tunisian football, Étoile du Sahel.
However, Moussa struggled for form and on holding down a place in the team only making 16 appearances for Étoile du Sahel and only scoring 2 goals in the 2014–15 campaign.

Career in Europe

Petrolul Ploiești
Moussa arrived at his first European club, Petrolul Ploiești at the start of the 2015–16 Liga I season. Moussa played about half a season in Romania. He moved to Norway during the 2015 Norwegian transfer window.

Tromsø
In February 2015, Moussa signed a one-year contract with Norwegian Eliteserien side Tromsø.

Lokomotiv GO
Moussa moved to Lokomotiv Gorna Oryahovitsa in the Bulgarian Top Division for a short 6 months stint following being released by Tromsø, midway through his first season in Norway. Lokomotiv GO were relegated to the Bulgaria Second Division at the end of the season.

Dundee FC
On 14 July 2017, Moussa signed a two year deal with Scottish Premiership side Dundee.
On 18 July, he made his debut for Dundee scoring against Raith Rovers in a 2–1 victory in the group stage of the Scottish League Cup. Moussa started the season perfectly with 5 goals in 5 games for Dundee in the League Cup group stages including a hat-trick against Cowdenbeath. After returning from a knee operation Moussa scored his first league goal for the club in a 3–2 victory over St Johnstone.
Later on that season, Moussa scored his first brace for Dundee in a 2–1 win against St Johnstone, in their first bottom six fixture. On 31 January 2019, Moussa left Dundee by mutual consent. Moussa has remained a cult figure at the club since his departure due to his hot start and many moments of ineptitude on the pitch thereafter, along with his winning smile.

Concordia Chiajna
On 19 February 2019 Moussa signed a contract with Romanian Liga I side CS Concordia Chiajna.

Academica Clinceni
On 18 January 2020, Moussa joined Romanian club Academica Clinceni.

Career statistics

Club

Honours

Club
Étoile du Sahel
 Tunisian League: Runner-up 2014–15

References

External links
 
 

1988 births
Living people
People from La Marsa
Tunisian footballers
Association football forwards
Tunisian Ligue Professionnelle 1 players
Liga I players
Eliteserien players
First Professional Football League (Bulgaria) players
Scottish Professional Football League players
AS Marsa players
Étoile Sportive du Sahel players
FC Petrolul Ploiești players
Tromsø IL players
FC Lokomotiv Gorna Oryahovitsa players
Dundee F.C. players
CS Concordia Chiajna players
FC Botoșani players
LPS HD Clinceni players
Tunisian expatriate footballers
Expatriate footballers in Romania
Tunisian expatriate sportspeople in Romania
Expatriate footballers in Norway
Tunisian expatriate sportspeople in Norway
Expatriate footballers in Bulgaria
Tunisian expatriate sportspeople in Bulgaria
Expatriate footballers in Scotland
Tunisian expatriate sportspeople in Scotland